The Mississippi Valley State Delta Devils baseball team was a baseball team that represented the Mississippi Valley State University in the 2022 NCAA Division I baseball season. The Delta Devils were members of the Southwestern Athletic Conference and played their home games at Magnolia Field in Itta Bena, Mississippi. They were led by first-year head coach Stanley Stubbs.

Previous season
The Delta Devils finished the 2021 NCAA Division I baseball season 0–20 overall (0–17 conference) and fifth place in east division of the conference standings, as the season was limited to mostly conference games for most SWAC teams due to the COVID-19 pandemic. Following back-to-back win-less seasons, head coach Aaron Stevens was relieved of his duties. On July 27, 2021, Stanley Stubbs was named the head coach of the Delta Devils.

Roster

Schedule

! colspan=2 style="" | Regular Season
|- valign="top"

|- align="center" bgcolor="#ccffcc"
| 1 || February 20 ||  || Magnolia Field • Itta Bena, Mississippi || 15–3 || Valenzuela (1–0) || Sampson (1–1) || None || 43 || 1–0 || –
|- align="center" bgcolor="#ccffcc"
| 2 || February 20 || Rust || Magnolia Field • Itta Bena, Mississippi || 16–8 || Ortiz (1–0) || Jackson (0–1) || None || 48 || 2–0 || –
|- align="center" bgcolor="#ffcccc"
| 3 || February 25 || at Nicholls || Ben Meyer Diamond at Ray E. Didier Field • Thibodaux, Louisiana || 1–11 || Saltaformaggio (1–0) || McClendon (0–1) || None || 133 || 2–1 || –
|- align="center" bgcolor="#ffcccc"
| 4 || February 26 || at Nicholls || Ben Meyer Diamond at Ray E. Didier Field • Thibodaux, Louisiana || 0–10 || Theriot (1–1) || Valenzuela (1–1) || None || 301 || 2–2 || –
|- align="center" bgcolor="#ffcccc"
| 5 || February 27 || at Nicholls || Ben Meyer Diamond at Ray E. Didier Field • Thibodaux, Louisiana || 10–16 || Desandro (1–0) || Stallings (0–1) || None || 222 || 2–3 || –
|-

|- align="center" bgcolor="#ffcccc"
| 6 || March 1 || at Arkansas State || Tomlinson Stadium–Kell Field • Jonesboro, Arkansas || 2–17 || Williams (1–1) || McClendon (0–2) || None || 292 || 2–4 || –
|- align="center" bgcolor="#ffcccc"
| 7 || March 2 || at Arkansas State || Tomlinson Stadium–Kell Field • Jonesboro, Arkansas || 3–13 || Paschal (1–0) || Valenzuela (1–2) || None || 151 || 2–5 || –
|- align="center" bgcolor="#ccffcc"
| 8 || March 4 || at  || Torii Hunter Baseball Complex • Pine Bluff, Arkansas || 2–1 || McClendon (1–2) || Duran (0–2) || Stallings (1) || 273 || 3–5 || –
|- align="center" bgcolor="#ccffcc"
| 9 || March 5 || at Arkansas–Pine Bluff || Torii Hunter Baseball Complex • Pine Bluff, Arkansas || 16–9 || Valenzuela (2–2) || Elarton (0–1) || None || 216 || 4–5 || –
|- align="center" bgcolor="#fffdd0"
| 10 || March 5 || at Arkansas–Pine Bluff || Torii Hunter Baseball Complex • Pine Bluff, Arkansas || 8–8 || – || – || None || 265 || 4–5–1 || –
|- align="center" bgcolor="#bbbbbb"
| – || March 15 ||  || Magnolia Field • Itta Bena, Mississippi ||colspan=7| Game cancelled
|- align="center" bgcolor="#bbbbbb"
| – || March 15 || LeMoyne–Owen || Magnolia Field • Itta Bena, Mississippi ||colspan=7| Game cancelled
|- align="center" bgcolor="#ffcccc"
| 11 || March 19 ||  || Magnolia Field • Itta Bena, Mississippi || 5–6 || Crenshaw  (2–0) || Walker (0–1) || None || 107 || 4–6–1 || 0–1
|- align="center" bgcolor="#ccffcc"
| 12 || March 20 || Alabama A&M || Magnolia Field • Itta Bena, Mississippi || 8–7 || Santos (1–0) || Torres (0–3) || None || 95 || 5–6–1 || 1–1
|- align="center" bgcolor="#ccffcc"
| 13 || March 20 || Alabama A&M || Magnolia Field • Itta Bena, Mississippi || 8–7 || Walker (1–1) || Hernandez (0–1) || None || 122 || 6–6–1 || 2–1
|- align="center" bgcolor="#ffcccc"
| 14 || March 25 || at  || Moore–Kittles Field • Tallahassee, Florida || 3–12 || Viets (2–3) || Walker (1–2) || Langley (1) || 300 || 6–7–1 || 2–2
|- align="center" bgcolor="#ffcccc"
| 15 || March 26 || at Florida A&M || Moore–Kittles Field • Tallahassee, Florida || 3–20 || Wilkinson (2–3) || Valenzuela (2–3) || None || 350 || 6–8–1 || 2–3
|- align="center" bgcolor="#ffcccc"
| 16 || March 27 || at Florida A&M || Moore–Kittles Field • Tallahassee, Florida || 0–5 || Fox (1–2) || Stallings (0–2) || None || 350 || 6–9–1 || 2–4
|- align="center" bgcolor="#ccffcc"
| 17 || March 29 ||  || Magnolia Field • Itta Bena, Mississippi || 20–6 || McClendon (2–2) || Borders – || None || 66 || 7–9–1 || 2–4
|- align="center" bgcolor="#ccffcc"
| 18 || March 29 || Tougaloo || Magnolia Field • Itta Bena, Mississippi || 16–1 || Valenzuela (3–3) || Hickman – || None || 87 || 8–9–1 || 2–4
|-

|- align="center" bgcolor="#ffcccc"
| 19 || April 1 ||  || Magnolia Field • Itta Bena, Mississippi || 1–3 || Fisher (3–0) || Salazar-Ortega (0–1) || None || 92 || 8–10–1 || 2–5
|- align="center" bgcolor="#ccffcc"
| 20 || April 2 || Bethune–Cookman || Magnolia Field • Itta Bena, Mississippi || 3–2 || Stallings (1–2) || Santos (2–2) || None || 56 || 9–10–1 || 3–5
|- align="center" bgcolor="#ffcccc"
| 21 || April 3 || Bethune–Cookman || Magnolia Field • Itta Bena, Mississippi || 13–17 || Gonzalez (1–3) || Valenzuela (3–4) || None || 74 || 9–11–1 || 3–6
|- align="center" bgcolor="#ffcccc"
| 22 || April 8 || at  || Braddy Field • Jackson, Mississippi || 2–11 || Galatas (2–1) || McClendon (2–3) || None || 50 || 9–12–1 || 3–7
|- align="center" bgcolor="#ffcccc"
| 23 || April 9 || at Jackson State || Braddy Field • Jackson, Mississippi || 5–6 || Valdez (2–2) || Ortiz (1–1) || None || 75 || 9–13–1 || 3–8
|- align="center" bgcolor="#ffcccc"
| 24 || April 10 || at Jackson State || Braddy Field • Jackson, Mississippi || 7–21 || Marulanda (4–4) || Walker (1–3) || None || 75 || 9–14–1 || 3–9
|- align="center" bgcolor="#ffcccc"
| 25 || April 14 ||  || Magnolia Field • Itta Bena, Mississippi || 11–16 || Harris (3–2) || Reyes (0–1) || None || 49 || 9–15–1 || 3–10
|- align="center" bgcolor="#bbbbbb"
| – || April 15 || Alabama State || Magnolia Field • Itta Bena, Mississippi ||colspan=7| Game cancelled
|- align="center" bgcolor="#bbbbbb"
| – || April 16 || Alabama State || Magnolia Field • Itta Bena, Mississippi ||colspan=7| Game cancelled
|- align="center" bgcolor="#ccffcc"
| 26 || April 22 || at Bethune–Cookman || Jackie Robinson Ballpark • Daytona Beach, Florida || 12–2 || Stallings (2–2) || Lipthratt (4–3) || None || 66 || 10–15–1 || 4–10
|- align="center" bgcolor="#ffcccc"
| 27 || April 23 || at Bethune–Cookman || Jackie Robinson Ballpark • Daytona Beach, Florida || 3–11 || Santos (4–3) || McClendon (2–4) || None || 77 || 10–16–1 || 4–11
|- align="center" bgcolor="#ffcccc"
| 28 || April 24 || at Bethune–Cookman || Jackie Robinson Ballpark • Daytona Beach, Florida || 1–11 || Vazquez (4–3) || Ortiz (1–2) || None || 91 || 10–17–1 || 4–12
|- align="center" bgcolor="#ffcccc"
| 29 || April 26 || at  || FedExPark • Memphis, Tennessee || 4–13 || Kessinger (2–0) || Valenzuela (3–5) || None || 312 || 10–18–1 || 4–12
|- align="center" bgcolor="#ffcccc"
| 30 || April 29 || Florida A&M || Magnolia Field • Itta Bena, Mississippi || 5–16 || Viets (7–3) || Stallings (2–3) || None || 61 || 10–19–1 || 4–13
|- align="center" bgcolor="#ffcccc"
| 31 || April 30 || Florida A&M || Magnolia Field • Itta Bena, Mississippi || 6–17 || Wilkinson (4–4) || Ortiz (1–3) || None || 112 || 10–20–1 || 4–14
|-

|- align="center" bgcolor="#ffcccc"
| 32 || May 1 || Florida A&M || Magnolia Field • Itta Bena, Mississippi || 6–11 || McCollum (2–1) || Valenzuela (3–6) || None || 83 || 10–21–1 || 4–15
|- align="center" bgcolor="#ffcccc"
| 33 || May 7 || at Alabama A&M || James Clemens High School • Madison, Alabama || 4–5 || Seaton (2–2) || Salazar-Ortega (0–2) || None || 87 || 10–22–1 || 4–16
|- align="center" bgcolor="#ffcccc"
| 34 || May 7 || at Alabama A&M || James Clemens High School • Madison, Alabama || 0–5 || Torres (2–4) || Ortiz (1–4) || None || 93 || 10–23–1 || 4–17
|- align="center" bgcolor="#ffcccc"
| 35 || May 8 || at Alabama A&M || James Clemens High School • Madison, Alabama || 5–10 || Whitted (2–3) || McClendon (2–3) || None || 133 || 10–24–1 || 4–18
|- align="center" bgcolor="#ffcccc"
| 36 || May 13 || at Alabama State || Wheeler–Watkins Baseball Complex • Montgomery, Alabama || 5–16 || Pooler (8–2) || Stallings (2–4) || None || 168 || 10–25–1 || 4–19
|- align="center" bgcolor="#ffcccc"
| 37 || May 14 || at Alabama State || Wheeler–Watkins Baseball Complex • Montgomery, Alabama || 1–8 || McIntosh (3–3) || Ortiz (1–5) || None || 250 || 10–26–1 || 4–20
|- align="center" bgcolor="#ffcccc"
| 38 || May 15 || at Alabama State || Wheeler–Watkins Baseball Complex • Montgomery, Alabama || 7–9 || Melendez (1–0) || Walker (1–4) || None || 280 || 10–27–1 || 4–21
|- align="center" bgcolor="#ffcccc"
| 39 || May 19 || Jackson State || Magnolia Field • Itta Bena, Mississippi || 4–19 || Galatas (5–2) || Ortiz (1–6) || None || 45 || 10–29–1 || 4–23
|- align="center" bgcolor="#ffcccc"
| 40 || May 20 || Jackson State || Magnolia Field • Itta Bena, Mississippi || 5–27 || Gonzalez (6–4) || McClendon (2–7) || None || 62 || 10–30–1 || 4–24
|- align="center" bgcolor="#ffcccc"
| 41 || May 21 || vs Jackson State || MGM Park • Biloxi, Mississippi || 8–17 || Marulanda (7–7) || Oritz (1–7) || None || 201 || 10–31–1 || 4–25
|-

Awards

SWAC Players of the Week

Conference awards

References

Mississippi Valley State
Mississippi Valley State Delta Devils baseball seasons
Mississippi Valley State